Pachymerinus australis is a species of centipede in the Geophilidae family. It is endemic to Australia, and was first described in 1920 by American biologist Ralph Vary Chamberlin.

Description
The original description of this species is based on a specimen measuring 45 mm in length with 71 pairs of legs.

Distribution
The species occurs in New South Wales.

Behaviour
The centipedes are solitary terrestrial predators that inhabit plant litter, soil and rotting wood.

References

 

 
australis
Centipedes of Australia
Endemic fauna of Australia
Fauna of New South Wales
Animals described in 1920
Taxa named by Ralph Vary Chamberlin